Graniberia is a genus of air-breathing land snail, a terrestrial pulmonate gastropod mollusc in the subfamily Granariinae of the family Chondrinidae.

Species
 Graniberia braunii (Rossmässler, 1842) (synonym: Granaria braunii braunii (Rossmässler, 1842)

References

 Bank, R. A.; Neubert, E. (2017). Checklist of the land and freshwater Gastropoda of Europe. Last update: July 16, 2017

External links
 Rossmässler, E. A. (1838-1844). Iconographie der Land- & Süßwasser- Mollusken, mit vorzüglicher Berücksichtigung der europäischen noch nicht abgebildeten Arten. (1) 2 (1/2) [7/8: 4 + 1-44. pl 31-40 [≥ June 1838]; (1) 2 (3/4) [9-10]: I-IV + 1-46. pl. 41-50 [≥ Sept. 1839]; (1) 2 (5) [11]: I-IV + 1–15. pl. 51–55 [≥ June 1842]; (1) 2 (6) [12]: I-IV + 1-37. pl. 56-60 [≥Sept. 1844]. [Dresden und Leipzig (Arnoldische Buchhandlung)]

Chondrinidae